McClellan Park is a census-designated place (CDP) in Sacramento County, California. The 2010 United States Census reported that McClellan Park's population was 743. It is the site of the former McClellan Air Force Base, closed by the federal government in 2003. McClellan Air Force Base (currently McClellan Park) was named in honor of test pilot Hezekiah McClellan.
According to the United States Census Bureau, the CDP covers an area of 4.1 square miles (10.5 km2), all of it land. Its closest neighbor is North Highlands.

Demographics
The 2010 United States Census reported that McClellan Park had a population of 743. The racial makeup of McClellan Park was 467 (62.9%) White, 99 (13.3%) African American, 13 (1.7%) Native American, 27 (3.6%) Asian, 21 (2.8%) Pacific Islander, 31 (4.2%) from other races, and 85 (11.4%) from two or more races. Hispanic or Latino of any race were 110 persons (14.8%).

The Census reported that 541 people (72.8% of the population) lived in households, 202 (27.2%) lived in non-institutionalized group quarters, and 0 (0%) were institutionalized.

There were 194 households, out of which 116 (59.8%) had children under the age of 18 living in them, 42 (21.6%) were opposite-sex married couples living together, 87 (44.8%) had a female householder with no husband present, 16 (8.2%) had a male householder with no wife present.  There were 19 (9.8%) unmarried opposite-sex partnerships, and 3 (1.5%) same-sex married couples or partnerships. 39 households (20.1%) were made up of individuals, and 2 (1.0%) had someone living alone who was 65 years of age or older. The average household size was 2.79.  There were 145 families (74.7% of all households); the average family size was 3.20.

The population was spread out, with 240 people (32.3%) under the age of 18, 230 people (31.0%) aged 18 to 24, 158 people (21.3%) aged 25 to 44, 93 people (12.5%) aged 45 to 64, and 22 people (3.0%) who were 65 years of age or older.  The median age was 22.6 years. For every 100 females, there were 86.2 males.  For every 100 females age 18 and over, there were 75.9 males.

The homeowner vacancy rate was 0%; the rental vacancy rate was 12.6%.  2 people (0.3% of the population) lived in owner-occupied housing units and 539 people (72.5%) lived in rental housing units.

References

Census-designated places in Sacramento County, California
Census-designated places in California